EventPlan Limited was formed in 2000. It is a modest-sized UK-based historical events company that specializes in staging a limited number of living history and live re-enactment displays each year including for the National Trust, local councils and individual historic properties. It is directed by Eleanore Hill-Bruce since January 2016 with many years of previous event experience previously.

Events
EventPlan has been responsible for staging events including The Battle of Orgreave for Jeremy Deller, Artangel and Channel 4 in 2001. Although a live event (with just one brief break) The Battle of Orgreave was filmed in real time by Hollywood director Mike Figgis for Channel 4's programme of the same name. With a minimum of direction, Figgis' camera crews recorded the action as it unfolded around them, resulting in footage that is very similar to that taken during the actual clash in 1984.

Other events include The Roman Army and Chariot Experience (RACE) in Jerash, Jordan in 2005, and ancient to modern era and multi-period shows for the Army Benevolent Fund, British army and others.  During 2014 commemorative projects include Centenary Great War, 70th, and 75th anniversary World War Two displays.

The company has previously assisted with a number of TV and film productions which include the BBC series D-Day to Berlin, Historyonics presented by Nick Knowles and Brainiac: History Abuse and Tetley Beer's spoof "Gladiator" TV advert. They have also arranged post-production ancient Macedonian war chants for the movie Alexander.

References

External links
 

British companies established in 2000
Entertainment companies of the United Kingdom